Zagan is a rural locality (a selo) in Zheltoyarovsky Selsoviet of Svobodnensky District, Amur Oblast, Russia. The population was 100 as of 2018. There are 4 streets.

Geography 
Zagan is located on the right bank of the Zeya River, 42 km northeast of Svobodny (the district's administrative centre) by road. Zheltoyarovo is the nearest rural locality.

References 

Rural localities in Svobodnensky District